Marriner Stoddard Eccles (September 9, 1890 – December 18, 1977) was an American economist and banker who served as the 7th chairman of the Federal Reserve from 1934 to 1948. After his term as chairman, Eccles continued to serve as a member of the Federal Reserve Board of Governors until 1951.

Eccles was known during his lifetime chiefly as having been the Chairman of the Federal Reserve under President Franklin D. Roosevelt. He has been remembered for having anticipated and supporting the theories of John Maynard Keynes relative to "inadequate aggregate spending" in the economy which appeared during his tenure. As Eccles wrote in his memoir Beckoning Frontiers (1951):

As mass production has to be accompanied by mass consumption, mass consumption, in turn, implies a distribution of wealth ... to provide men with buying power. ... Instead of achieving that kind of distribution, a giant suction pump had by 1929–1930 drawn into a few hands an increasing portion of currently produced wealth. ... The other fellows could stay in the game only by borrowing. When their credit ran out, the game stopped.

Early life 

Born in Logan, Utah to David and Ellen (Stoddard) Eccles, a Mormon polygamist family, on September 9, 1890. He was the eldest of the nine children by Ellen Stoddard, David Eccles' second wife. His family was extended by another twelve siblings from his father's first wife. Eccles was educated at the public schools of Baker, Oregon and attended Brigham Young College and served a Latter-day Saint mission to Scotland. After his mission, while working in a family enterprise in Blacksmith Fork Canyon, he learned of the untimely death of his father, David Eccles.

Career 
He was subsequently able to reorganize and consolidate the assets of his father's industrial conglomerate and banking network. Eccles expanded the banking interests into a large western chain of banks called Eccles-Browning Affiliated Banks. He was a millionaire by age 22. The company withstood several bank runs during the Great Depression and, as a leading banker, Eccles became involved with the creation of the Emergency Banking Act of 1933 and the Federal Deposit Insurance Corporation.

After a brief stint at the Treasury Department and with the support of treasury secretary Henry Morgenthau, Jr., Eccles was appointed by President Roosevelt as the Chairman of the Federal Reserve. Eccles was reappointed chairman in 1936, 1940, and 1944 and served until 1948. In February 1944, Roosevelt appointed Eccles for another 14-year term on the board and Eccles stayed on the board until 1951, when he resigned a few months after the 1951 Accord. Eccles had also participated in post-World War II Bretton Woods negotiations that created the World Bank and International Monetary Fund.

Eccles retired to Utah in 1951 to run his companies and write his memoirs, titled Beckoning Frontiers: Public and Personal Recollections. He further consolidated industrial and family assets, finally organizing a series of foundations representing assets that he had managed for various family members. These foundations have served Utah and the Intermountain West in support of educational, artistic, humanitarian, and scientific activities. He died in Salt Lake City, Utah in 1977 and was entombed in the Larkin Sunset Lawn Mausoleum.

Personal life 
In 1913, he married the former May Campbell Young. The couple did not have a happy marriage, caused partly by Eccles' lack of attention towards her, and although they were legally married 35 years until their divorce in 1948, they separated soon after the marriage and lived largely separate lives. His grand-niece, Hope Eccles, is married to former Vice Chair of the Federal Reserve Randal Quarles.

Legacy 
Eccles was and is seen as an early proponent of demand stimulus projects to fend off the ravages of the Great Depression. Eccles was famously rebuked by Congresswoman Jessie Sumner (R, IL) during a House of Representatives hearing on the increasingly liberal policies of the Roosevelt administration and the Federal Reserve, when she said, "you just love socialism." He became known as a defender of Keynesian ideas, though his ideas predated Keynes' The General Theory of Employment, Interest, and Money (1936). In that respect, he is considered by some to have seen monetary policy having secondary importance and that as a result he allowed the Federal Reserve to be sublimated to the interests of the Treasury.

In this view, the Federal Reserve after 1935 acquired new instruments to command monetary policy, but it did not change its behavior significantly. Further, his defense of the Federal Reserve-Treasury accord in 1951 is sometimes seen as a reversal of his previous policy stances.

Marriner Eccles received the Golden Plate Award of the American Academy of Achievement, alongside his brother George S. Eccles, at the 1972 Achievement Summit in Salt Lake City. The Eccles Building that houses the headquarters of the Federal Reserve in Washington, D.C. was named after Eccles in 1982. The naming was a component of the Garn-St. Germain Depository Institutions Act lead-sponsored by Senator Jake Garn (R, UT) and Congressman Fernand St. Germain (D, RI).

References

Further reading 

 Nelson, Mark Wayne. Jumping the Abyss: Marriner S. Eccles and the New Deal, 1933–1940 (University of Utah Press, 2017), xxvi, 424 pp

External links 

 Utah History Encyclopedia Biography
 University of Utah Biography
 Biography, bookrags.com.
 Hyman, Sydney, Marriner S. Eccles: Private Entrepreneur and Public Servant (Palo Alto, CA: Graduate School of Business, Stanford University, 1976)
 Biography on Richmond Fed's website 
 "People Who Made a Difference: Marriner S. Eccles", history.utah.gov.
 1933 Senate Testimony
 Papers of Marriner S. Eccles digitized from holdings of the University of Utah
 Marriner S Eccles Papers Digital Collection Marriner S. Eccles Papers Collection
 Statements and Speeches of Marriner S. Eccles
Marriner S. Eccles papers, 1910–1985
Marriner S. Eccles photograph collection, 1940–1968
Marriner S. Eccles Digital photograph collection
Treasury-Federal Reserve Accord – Marriner Stoddard Eccles – Federal Reserve Bank of Richmond 
 

1890 births
1977 deaths
20th-century Mormon missionaries
American bankers
American Mormon missionaries in Scotland
American people of Scottish descent
Brigham Young College alumni
Chairs of the Federal Reserve
Eccles family
Keynesians
Latter Day Saints from Utah
Latter Day Saints from Oregon
Utah Republicans
Franklin D. Roosevelt administration personnel
Truman administration personnel